Paracanthella is a genus of tephritid  or fruit flies in the family Tephritidae.

Species
Paracanthella guttata Chen, 1938
Paracanthella marginemaculata (Macquart, 1851)
Paracanthella pavonina (Portschinsky, 1875)

References

Tephritinae
Tephritidae genera